Pebble TV is a Dutch television channel in the Netherlands and Belgium, which is aimed at children and airs children's programs from the past. The channel broadcasts 24 hours a day. The station began its test broadcasts on October 29, 2009. The official first broadcast was November 12, 2009. Founder is former Kindernet director Henk Krop. Co-initiator is Bas van Toor, better known as the clown Bassie.

See also
Kindernet

External links
 (Netherlands)
 (Belgium)
Official YouTube page

Children's television networks
Television channels in the Netherlands
Television channels in Belgium
Television channels and stations established in 2009